Kannur is a village located in the Puthige panchayath, in Kasaragod district of the Indian state of Kerala. Kannur is home to the Ananthapura Lake Temple, a Hindu temple located in the middle of a lake.

Peral-Kannur and Kannur
Peral-Kannur is a small village under the administration of Puthige panchayath in Kasaragod district. Kannur is a city and headquarters of the Kannur district some 106 kilometers south.

Demographics
As of 2011 Census, Kannur village had total population of 2,421 where 1,183 are males and 1,238 are females. Population in the age group 0-6 was 284 among which 147 are males and 137 are females. Kannur had overall literacy of 90% where male literacy stands at 94.1% and female literacy was 86.1%.

Landmarks
Peral-Kannur can be accessed from Madhur-Seethangoli road. The village school is located in this junction. The village Dargah and the watersfall can be accessed from this junction.

Geography and climate
Kannur lies along the Konkan coast, a rugged section of the western coastline of India on the Laccadive Sea, and is bounded on the west by the Mogral River and on the east by the KINFRA Industrial Park. The village has heavy rainfalls during the monsoons season. The coastal area of Kannur is very rich in natural resources including rainforests and backwaters.

Image gallery

References

Suburbs of Kasaragod